The women's 100 metres hurdles event at the 2007 Asian Athletics Championships was held in Amman, Jordan on July 27.

Results
Wind: +1.9 m/s

References
Final results

2007 Asian Athletics Championships
Sprint hurdles at the Asian Athletics Championships
2007 in women's athletics